Steven Jyles (born September 25, 1982) is a former professional Canadian football quarterback. He was signed as an undrafted free agent by the Edmonton Eskimos of the Canadian Football League in 2006. He played college football for Louisiana–Monroe. Jyles was also a member of the Saskatchewan Roughriders, Winnipeg Blue Bombers, Toronto Argonauts, and BC Lions.

Professional football

Edmonton Eskimos
Steven Jyles signed with the Edmonton Eskimos prior to the 2006 CFL season on March 23, 2006. He dressed in all 18 games and scored his first CFL touchdown on October 21, 2006 against the Montreal Alouettes in Olympic Stadium. He again dressed for all 18 games as the third-string quarterback in 2007, seeing limited playing time behind Ricky Ray and Stefan LeFors.

Saskatchewan Roughriders
On February 8, 2008, Jyles was traded, along with Edmonton's 2008 2nd round CFL Draft choice, to the Saskatchewan Roughriders for Fred Perry and Saskatchewan's 2008 2nd round draft choice. He made his first career start against his former team, the Eskimos, on October 25, 2008 in a 55–9 win (although Jyles would be pulled at halftime). He completed his first professional touchdown pass against the BC Lions in week 2 to Andy Fantuz in a 26–16 win.

In 2009, he competed against Darian Durant for the open quarterback position, following Michael Bishop's off-season release. Durant would win this battle and he would not relinquish the role as he started all 18 games that season. Subsequently, Jyles saw little playing time.

Winnipeg Blue Bombers
Jyles signed as a free agent with the Winnipeg Blue Bombers on February 23, 2010, joining his former Saskatchewan offensive co-ordinator, Paul LaPolice, who had been hired as the Blue Bombers' head coach. It was initially thought that Jyles would have an excellent chance to be the starting quarterback for the team after they had released incumbent Michael Bishop, but two months later, the team announced that they had signed Buck Pierce, meaning Jyles would be relegated to backup duty.

Pierce started the 2010 season as the starter, but was injured in game 3, meaning that Jyles would get the next start, again against Edmonton. After winning his first game as a Bomber against Edmonton, he would lose his next two before Pierce returned from injury to start game 7 against the Hamilton Tiger-Cats. However, Pierce was again injured in that game, so Jyles started the next game against Montreal. Pierce came back for the Labour Day Classic against the Saskatchewan Roughriders, but, for his third consecutive start, was injured in the game. Jyles was declared the starter for the remainder of the season, but he himself was injured in week 17 against the Toronto Argonauts, effectively ending his season and the Bombers' playoff hopes that year.

Toronto Argonauts
On March 30, 2011 Jyles was traded to the Toronto Argonauts in exchange for a 1st round selection (4th overall) in the 2011 CFL Draft and a conditional draft choice in 2012. Jyles spent the first nine games of the 2011 season on the nine-game injured list after he continued to recover from the injury he sustained during the previous season. After incumbent starting quarterback Cleo Lemon was released on September 6, 2011, Jyles was named the starter for the team's game against the BC Lions on September 10, 2011. Jyles would go on to start the following eight games of the season, having sat out the last regular season game due to injury.

Edmonton Eskimos
Jyles was again traded in the offseason, this time to the Edmonton Eskimos on December 12, 2011, along with Grant Shaw and a 2012 first round draft pick, for Ricky Ray. On June 24, Jyles was declared the starting quarterback for 2012. Jyles started the first eight games of the season for the Eskimos before he was demoted to 2nd and 3rd string for the remainder of the season. Ray went on to win the 100th Grey Cup with the Toronto Argonauts and Jyles was released by the Eskimos on January 21, 2013.

BC Lions
On April 7, 2014, Jyles was signed by the BC Lions to compete for a back-up role to entrenched starter, Travis Lulay.  He retired from the CFL before the start of training camp.

Statistics

References

External links
BC Lions bio

1982 births
Living people
American players of Canadian football
BC Lions players
Edmonton Elks players
American football quarterbacks
Canadian football quarterbacks
People from Independence, Louisiana
Players of American football from Louisiana
Saskatchewan Roughriders players
Toronto Argonauts players
Winnipeg Blue Bombers players
Louisiana–Monroe Warhawks football players